Dmitriy Mironchik (born 25 January 1970) is a Belarusian rower. He competed in the men's coxless pair event at the 1996 Summer Olympics.

References

1970 births
Living people
Belarusian male rowers
Olympic rowers of Belarus
Rowers at the 1996 Summer Olympics
Place of birth missing (living people)